Diocese  of Gegharkounik ( Gegharkuniki t'em), is a diocese of the Armenian Apostolic Church covering the Gegharkunik Province of Armenia. The name is derived from the historic Gegharkunik canton of Syunik (historic province) province of ancient Greater Armenia. 

The Diocese of Gegharkounik was officially founded on 30 May 1996, upon a kontakion issued by Catholicos Karekin I. The diocesan headquarters are located in the provincial capital Gavar, with the seat being the Holy Mother of God Cathedral of the town.

References

External links
Churches of Gegharkunik Province 

Gegharkounik
Christianity in Armenia
Gegharkunik Province
Oriental Orthodox dioceses in Armenia